Phyllocrania paradoxa, common name ghost mantis, is a small species of mantis from Africa remarkable for its leaf-like body. It is one of the three species in the genus Phyllocrania. It is known for its distinct and exclusive camouflaged appearance of a dry weathered leaf.

Description

It comes in various brownish shades from very dark brown (almost black) to greenish gray.  An individual's colors change between molts and are also dependent on light and humidity levels.

Phyllocrania paradoxa is camouflaged so as to appear as dead, dried-up leaf material. It has an  elongated head, a flattened, extended prothorax and leaf-like protrusions from its limbs. The mantis also has a forewing that looks like a desiccated leaf, and the "creases" in the wings are actually shadings of pigment. In the wild, the ghost praying mantis effectively blends in against dead leaves. Predators such as birds tend to overlook insects that resemble their background, and by staying still the ghost praying mantis can go unnoticed.

If threatened, big nymphs and adult females adopt thanatosis, i.e. they play dead, whereas adult males run or fly away.

P. paradoxa oothecae can hatch out up to three dozen young. 1st and 2nd instar nymphs of this species are dark colored and use ant mimicry as a defense.

Sexual Dimorphism
As with most or all species of mantis, Phyllocrania paradoxa is sexually dimorphic, with females being larger than males.  Females have six abdominal segments.  Males are shorter, narrower, and have eight-segmented abdomens.  At the 5th instar and above males are thinner than females and have smaller appendages (lateral of the abdomen).  At the 6th instar and above their crowns are different.  When adult, males have longer and thicker antennae than females and transparent wings, which are longer than the abdomen. They are good flyers and are significantly thinner than the females.  At the 5th instar and above females are more compact than males and have bigger appendages.  At the 6th instar and above the crown of females are as wide as their head and more line and smoother than the male`s crown.  When adult, females are significantly more compact than males, with shorter antennae and wings that do not cover the abdomen.

Range
Phyllocrania paradoxa have a wide range across the African continent and its islands and can be found in Angola, Cameroon, Cape Province, Congo basin, Ethiopia, Ghana, Guinea, Ivory Coast, Kenya, Malawi, Madagascar, Mozambique, Namibia, Somalia, South Africa, Sudan, Tanzania, Togo, Transvaal, Uganda and Zimbabwe. It is also found in South Europe.

Habitat
Ghost mantis inhabit dry areas, bushes, shrubbes, trees in the open.

Gallery

See also
List of mantis genera and species
Dead Leaf Mantis
Extatosoma tiaratum

Bibliography
For a technical discussion of an aspect of this species' anatomy refer to The cervical sclerites of Mantodea discussed in the context of dictyopteran phylogeny by Frank Wieland, Entomologische Abhandlungen 63, Museum für Tierkunde Dresden, 2006

References

External links
  Bolton Museum and Archive Service
  2007 InsectaCulture Videos of Phyllocrania paradoxa
 Ghost mantis care sheet
 Deadlymantis.com This site have some amazing pictures of praying mantis and information on multiple species. Also, there are links to supplies for rearing and exotic live specimens.

External links
 

Hymenopodidae
Mantodea of Africa
Mantodea of Europe
Insects of Angola
Insects of West Africa
Insects of Cameroon
Insects of the Central African Republic
Insects of the Comoros
Insects of the Democratic Republic of the Congo
Insects of Ethiopia
Insects of Gabon
Insects of Kenya
Insects of Madagascar
Insects of Malawi
Insects of Mozambique
Insects of Namibia
Insects of the Republic of the Congo
Insects of Somalia
Insects of South Africa
Insects of Sudan
Insects of Tanzania
Insects of Uganda
Insects of Zimbabwe
Insect rearing
Insects described in 1838

tr:Phyllocrania